Special Things is the seventh studio album by the Pointer Sisters, released in 1980 on Planet Records.

History
The album marked their third venture with producer Richard Perry and featured a more stylized R&B/pop production, launching the group into its most successful period. The album spawned their second top three gold-certified single, "He's So Shy". The album also contains minor hit "Could I Be Dreamin’" and two songs written by Burt Bacharach, "The Love Too Good to Last" and "Where Did the Time Go".

Track listing

Personnel 
The Pointer Sisters
 Anita Pointer – lead vocals (1, 3, 5, 8), backing vocals, vocal arrangements
 June Pointer – lead vocals (2, 4, 6, 7), backing vocals, vocal arrangements
 Ruth Pointer – lead vocals (9), backing vocals, vocal arrangements

Musicians
 Greg Phillinganes – keyboards (1, 3-5, 7, 9), synthesizers (5), clavinet (6)
 Tom Snow – keyboards (2), synthesizers (2), arrangements (2)
 Lance Ong – synthesizers (3, 4)
 Michael Boddicker – synthesizer programming (5), synthesizers (8)
 John Barnes – Fender Rhodes (6), keyboards (8)
 Clarence McDonald – acoustic piano (6)
 Burt Bacharach – horn arrangements (3), string arrangements (3, 7), keyboards (7)
 Paul Jackson Jr. – guitar (1, 3, 5, 9), guitar solo (4)
 Tim May – guitar (2, 6, 8)
 Ben Bridges – guitar (4)
 Marlo Henderson – guitar (4, 5, 7)
 Mark Goldenberg – guitar (6, 8)
 David Williams – guitar (7, 9)
 Nathan Watts – bass (1-5, 8, 9), percussion (5)
 John Pierce – bass (6)
 James Jamerson – bass (7)
 Ollie E. Brown – drums (1, 3, 5)
 James Gadson – drums (2, 6, 8)
 Raymond Pounds – drums (4)
 Ricky Lawson – drums (7, 9)
 Paulinho da Costa – percussion (1-4, 8)
 Jay Hutson – alto flute (1), saxophone (4)
 Don Myrick – alto flute (1), saxophone (4), alto sax solo (9)
 Bill Reichenbach Jr. – trombone (1, 4)
 Dick Hyde – trombone (4)
 Chuck Findley – trumpet (1), flugelhorn (1, 3)
 Steve Madaio – trumpet (1, 4), flugelhorn (1)
 Warren Looney – flugelhorn (3)
 Larry Gittens – trumpet (4)
 Gary Grant – trumpet (4)
 Henry Sigismonti – French horn (1)
 Trevor Lawrence – arrangements (1, 6, 9), horn arrangements (1, 4, 6, 7, 9), string arrangements (1, 5, 6, 9), conductor (1, 5, 6, 9), orchestration (3)
 Sid Sharp – concertmaster (1, 3, 5-7, 9)

Production 
 Richard Perry – producer
 Trevor Lawrence – associate producer
 Gabe Veltri – recording
 Tim Dennen – assistant engineer 
 Jim Küenzi – assistant engineer 
 Stephen Marcussen – assistant engineer
 Raven Royce-Jordan – assistant engineer
 James Guthrie – remixing
 Mike Reese – mastering 
 Doug Sax – mastering 
 The Mastering Lab (Los Angeles, CA) – mastering location 
 Daniel Kushnick – production coordinator
 Michael Solomon – production coordinator
 John Kosh – art direction, design 
 Aaron Rapoport – photography

Chart positions

References

External links
 

1980 albums
The Pointer Sisters albums
Albums produced by Richard Perry
Planet Records albums